141 Minutes from the Unfinished Sentence is a 1975 Hungarian drama film directed by Zoltán Fábri. It was entered into the 9th Moscow International Film Festival where Fábri won a Special Prize for Directing.

Cast
 András Bálint as Lőrinc Parcen Nagy
 Mari Csomós as Éva
 Zoltán Latinovits as Professor Wavra
 Anikó Sáfár as Désirée, Lőrinc's sister
 Mária Bisztrai as Laura (as Bisztray Mária)
 Margit Makay as Grandmother
 László Mensáros as Károly Parcen Nagy
 Margit Dajka as Ms. Hupka (as Dayka Margit)
 Noémi Apor as Mrs. Timmermann
 Lujza Orosz as Mrs. Rózsa
 György Cserhalmi as Béla
 Sándor Lukács as Miklós Vidovics
 András Kern as Kesztyűs

References

External links
 

1975 films
1975 drama films
Hungarian drama films
1970s Hungarian-language films
Films directed by Zoltán Fábri